The flag of Papua New Guinea (Tok Pisin: plak bilong Papua Niugini) was adopted on 1 July 1971. In the hoist, it depicts the Southern Cross; in the fly, a Raggiana bird-of-paradise is silhouetted. The design was chosen through a nationwide design competition in early 1971. The winning designer was Susan Karike, who was 15 at the time.

Red and black have long been traditional colours of many Papua New Guinean tribes. Black-white-red was the colour of the German Empire flag, which had colonised New Guinea prior to 1918. The bird-of-paradise is also found on the national coat-of-arms. The Southern Cross shows that it is a country in the Southern Hemisphere and can be seen in Papua New Guinea.

Prior to independence, the Australian administration proposed a vertical tricolour flag with blue, yellow and green bands, along with the bird of paradise and southern cross, designed by Hal Holman. The blue was said to represent the sea and islands of New Guinea, the Southern Cross was a guide for the travelling peoples, the gold represented the coastlines, mineral wealth, and unity, and the green represented the forested highlands and mainland, with the Bird of Paradise representing the unification under one nation. It had a mainly negative reception, due to its appearance as that of a "mechanically contrived outcome", thus the alternative proposal attributed to Susan Karike was chosen instead.

Government flags

Historical flags of Papua New Guinea

See also

 List of Papua New Guinean flags
 Flags depicting the Southern Cross

References 

Flags introduced in 1971
National flags
Flag
Flags adopted through competition
Southern Cross flags
Flags displaying animals